"1st Day Out tha Feds" is a song by American rapper Gucci Mane, released on May 27, 2016. It is the lead single from his ninth studio album Everybody Looking (2016) and the first song he released after he was released from jail the day before. The song was produced by Mike Will Made It.

Background
In 2014, Gucci Mane was arrested for possession of firearm and agreed to a plea deal that reduced his sentence to September 2016. He was released earlier than expected, on May 26, 2016. Shortly after his release, he began recording music in the studio. He premiered the song on The Breakfast Club on the following morning.

Content
In the song, Gucci Mane raps about the violence he is used to and his harsh life in prison, reflecting on his family and past mistakes as well: "They call me crazy so much I think I'm starting to believe 'em / I did some things to some people that was downright evil / Is it karma coming back to me, so much drama? / My own mama turned her back on me, and that's my mama".

Critical reception
The song was met with generally positive reviews. Tom Breihan of Stereogum compared it to Gucci Mane's 2009 song "First Day Out", another song about being released from prison, writing, "But he may have outdone that one with his new one." Paul A. Thompson of Pitchfork wrote that "Gucci's delivery is less congested, less guttural, but the writing is as sharp as ever".

Music video
The music video was released on July 5, 2016. Directed by Gabriel Hart, it finds Gucci Mane in his house, throwing money and appearing with several clones in his home office.

Charts

Certifications

References

2016 singles
2016 songs
Gucci Mane songs
Song recordings produced by Mike Will Made It
Songs written by Gucci Mane
Songs written by Mike Will Made It
Atlantic Records singles
Songs written by Asheton Hogan
Songs about prison